The 2021 FIS Nordic Junior and U23 World Ski Championships were held from 9 to 14 February 2021 in Vuokatti and Lahti, Finland.

Schedule
All times are local (UTC+2).

Cross-country

Nordic combined

Ski jumping

Medal summary

Junior events

Cross-country skiing

Nordic combined

Ski jumping

Under-23 events

Cross-country skiing

Medal tables

All events

Junior events

Under-23 events

References

2020
2021 in cross-country skiing
2021 in ski jumping
Junior World Ski Championships
2021 in Finnish sport
2021 in youth sport
International sports competitions hosted by Finland
Sports competitions in Lahti
February 2021 sports events in Europe